Redi Halilaj (born 31 August 1989) is an Albanian former cyclist, who last rode for .

Major results

2007
 10th GP Dell'Arno
2009
 2nd National Road Race Championships
2010
 1st  National Road Race Championships
 1st Stage 6 Tour of Albania
2013
 1st  National Road Race Championships
 1st  National Time Trial Championships
2015
 1st  National Road Race Championships
2016
 3rd National Road Race Championships
 3rd Balkan Elite Road Classics
 9th Philadelphia International Cycling Classic
2017
 1st Stage 4 Tour Eritrea
 2nd National Road Race Championships
 5th Asmara Circuit
 10th Overall Tour of Albania

References

1989 births
Living people
Sportspeople from Kavajë
Albanian male cyclists
European Games competitors for Albania
Cyclists at the 2015 European Games